"The 1" (stylized in all lowercase) is a song recorded by American singer-songwriter Taylor Swift, for her eighth studio album, Folklore (2020), which was released on July 24, 2020, through Republic Records. The song was a released as a digital promotional single on October 9, 2020, in Germany. As the opening track of the album, the song was written by Swift and Aaron Dessner, with production from the latter.

"The 1" is a minimally produced, bouncy, soft rock tune with electronic elements, indie folk textures, and indie-pop instrumentals. Written from the perspective of one of Swift's friends, the song describes the narrator's newborn positive approach to life and past romance, in a sad but humorous tone, using numerous one-liners. Upon release, "The 1" received widespread acclaim from music critics, who commended its stripped-back nature and witty lyricism.

The song debuted at number one on the United States Spotify chart with 4.175 million streams, becoming the biggest song debut by a female artist in the platform's history, and the second biggest of 2020 globally with 7.420 million streams, only behind "Cardigan", the lead single of Folklore. On the Billboard Hot 100, "The 1" arrived at number four, constituting Swift's record-extending 28 top-10 entries and 18 top-10 debuts in the US; accompanied by "Cardigan" at number one and "Exile" at number six in the same week, Swift became the first ever act in history to debut two songs in the top four and three songs in the top six, simultaneously. "The 1" also reached the top 10 in Australia, Canada, Ireland, Malaysia, New Zealand, Singapore, and the United Kingdom.

Background and release 

In a Vulture interview, Aaron Dessner revealed that "The 1" was one of the two last songs Swift had written for Folklore, the other being "Hoax"; the tracks were described as bookends of the project by her. The singer went through the files that Dessner had sent to her and wrote the song to one of the compositions, in a couple of hours in the middle of the night. Dessner worked on the music for the voice memo Swift sent back, tracked her vocals, and sent it to Bryce Dessner in France, who added the orchestration to the song.

On July 23, 2020, Swift revealed the track listing of Folklore, where "The 1" placed first, and released the album on July 24, 2020. "The 1" was released as a promotional single in Germany on October 9, 2020.

Composition and lyrics 

"The 1" is a soft rock song, slowed down and danceable, with Voxs Allegra Frank calling it a "gray-skied stroll through [Swift's] day-to-day". The song is driven by a "trickling" piano, supported by a bouncy arrangement of minimal percussion, electronic accents, indie folk textures and orchestrations. Lyrically, written from the perspective of a friend, "The 1" sees the narrator describe their optimistic headspace, reminiscing positively on a past love, confessing that they wish they could have been soulmates, with an underlying sense of humor juxtaposed against the sadness. The song is written in the key of C major and has a fast tempo of 140 beats per minute. Swift's vocal range in the song stretches from G3 to C5.

Critical reception
"The 1" received widespread acclaim from music critics. Consequence of Sounds Katie Moulton noted this as an example of "a transgression against 'radio-' and 'family-friendly' that Swift expresses on Folklore. Laura Snapes of The Guardian described the song as "a bouncy reminiscence of a lost lover from [Swift's] 'roaring twenties'. Writing for The Line of Best Fit, Eloise Bulmer stated that its titular line offers a glimpse into the "witty and unlucky-in-love Swift". Jody Rosen of the Los Angeles Times called the song a "stoic look back at a fizzled romance", driven by ringing piano chords and sprightly beats.

Roisin O'Connor of The Independent praised the track for its lyrics, characterized by one-liners. Courteney Larocca of Insider dubbed the song "incredibly solid", praising the "breezy attention to rhythm" Swift brings to the song, while painting a tale of a "the-one-who-got-away romance". Vulture's Craig Jenkins thought that the song sees Swift contemplating "languidly", yearning for a "storybook romance of her own or gesturing to some of the great love songs in recent history in her writing". The Atlantic's Spencer Kornhaber termed "The 1" a "conversational opener", and compared it to the works by Ed Sheeran, adding that the song has Sheeran's "suspicious whiff".

Vox'''s Allega Frank thought that "The 1" is one of the few times on the album where Swift plainly speaks about herself. Callie Ahlgrim of Business Insider named "The 1" one of the 16 best songs of 2020 in her mid-year list, and called it one of "the most relatable and stirring" songs Swift has ever released. Ahlgrim wrote that the song's power lies in its simple and truthful one-liners that evoke delicate moments of insecurity, citing the lyrics "It's another day waking up alone" and "But we were something, don't you think so?" as examples.

Commercial performance
Following the release of Folklore, "The 1" reached top-tier chart positions worldwide. On the global Spotify Top 200 songs chart, "The 1" debuted at number two with over 7.420 million streams, garnering the second biggest opening day for a song by a female artist in 2020, behind the lead single "Cardigan" (7.742 million). Seven weeks after Folklores release, the Billboard Global 200 chart was inaugurated, on which "The 1" appeared at number 114, dated September 19, 2020.

In the United States, "The 1" debuted at number one on the US Spotify chart with 4.175 million streams, becoming the biggest opening day for a song by a female artist in the platform's history. On the Billboard Hot 100, "The 1" debuted at number four, increasing Swift's total of top-10 songs to 28 and top-10 debuts to 18, accompanied by "Cardigan" at number one and "Exile" at number six in the same week. This made Swift the first ever act in history to debut two songs in the top four and three songs in the top six, simultaneously.

In Australia, "The 1" reached number four on ARIA Singles chart, accompanied by four other tracks from Folklore in the top-10, making the album with the most top-10 songs of 2020 in the country. On the Malaysian RIM Singles chart, the song was one of the five tracks from Folklore to arrive in the top-10, others being "Cardigan", "Exile", "The Last Great American Dynasty" and "My Tears Ricochet"; "The 1" landed at number 5.

On the Singaporean Top 30 Singles, "The 1" debuted at number five, with four other Folklore songs in the top-10. Whereas, on the Canadian Hot 100, Irish Singles and New Zealand Top 40 Singles charts, the song reached number seven. In Ireland, it was one of three tracks from Folklore'' to enter the top-10, pushing Swift's total Irish top-tens to 15. In New Zealand, the song arrived along with "Cardigan" and "Exile" in the top 10, increasing Swift's sum of top-10 tracks in the country to 19. Opening at number 10 on the UK Singles Chart, "The 1" increased Swift's sum of UK top-10 singles to 16.

Credits and personnel
Credits adapted from Tidal.

 Taylor Swift – vocals, songwriter
 Aaron Dessner – producer, songwriter, recording engineer, acoustic guitar, drum programming, electric guitar, Mellotron, piano, synth bass, synthesizer
 Kyle Resnick – engineer
 Jonathan Low – recording engineer, mixer
 Jason Treuting – percussion
 Thomas Bartlett – synthesizer
 Yuki Numata Resnick – viola, violin
 Laura Sisk – vocal engineer
 Randy Merrill – mastering engineer

Charts
Single chart usages for Australia
Single chart usages for Canada
Single chart usages for Ireland4
Single chart usages for Dutch100
Single chart usages for New Zealand
Single chart usages for Portugal
Single chart usages for Scotland
Single chart usages for Switzerland
Single chart usages for UK
Single chart usages for Billboardhot100

Certifications

Release history

See also
 List of Billboard Hot 100 top-ten singles in 2020
 List of top 10 singles in 2020 (Australia)
 List of top 10 singles in 2020 (Ireland)
 List of UK top-ten singles in 2020

References

2020 singles
2020 songs
American soft rock songs
Taylor Swift songs
Songs written by Taylor Swift
Songs written by Aaron Dessner
Song recordings produced by Aaron Dessner